Fun Asaru is a 1996 Maldivian drama film directed by Amila Adam, Emaz Abdul Shukoor and Aishath Leela. Produced by Television Maldives, the film stars Aishath Shiranee, Hussain Sobah, Ibrahim Rasheed and Hawwa Riyaza in pivotal roles.

Premise
Hana (Aishath Shiranee), is the only child in a wealthy family who falls in love with the servant working in the house, Sobah (Hussain Sobah). Their brief affair was exposed to her uncle (Ali Shameel) who outrageously throws Sobah out of their house. Sobah gets a chance to perform with a music band and becomes a notable musician. Hana and Sobah secretly continues their relationship. Despite her family's disapproval, Hana marries Sobah promising she will never return to them. Six years later, Hana, now happily married to Sobah and blessed with a child (Shelee) is diagnosed with cancer.

Cast 
 Aishath Shiranee as Hana
 Hussain Sobah as Sobah
 Ibrahim Rasheed as Fazeel
 Hawwa Riyaza as Lizy
 Sheleen as Hana's daughter
 Ali Shameel as Hana's uncle
 Arifa Ibrahim as Hana's mother
 Aiminaidhee as Mariyamdhee
 Chilhiya Moosa Manik as Saleem; Lizy's father
 Ibrahim Shakir
 Roanu Hassan Manik as Thakurufaan

Soundtrack

References

Maldivian drama films
1996 films
1996 drama films
Dhivehi-language films